The Annual Conference of Executives (CADE or CADE Ejecutivos) is an annual event for Peruvian business leaders, politicians and academics  to discuss topics related to business development and public policy. It is organized by the Peruvian Institute of Business Action (IPAE).

History of the forum

1960's 
The Peruvian Institute of Business Action, a non-profit organization and the organizer of the CADE Ejecutivos forum, was founded in 1959.

In 1961 the first conference of executives was held in Paracas, Ica, which had the title of Greater efficiency, rise of production: Keys to economic and social progress for the country. The event bought together 73 people, including authorities, businessmen and academics. The director of CEPAL, Raúl Prebisch; the IDB representative, Robert Menapace, and the Prime Minister of Peru, Pedro Beltrán Espantoso participated in the first edition .

The second conference was held in 1962 under the title of Best Executives for a Better Peru. Peru's president, Ricardo Pérez Godoy, gave the closing speech.  Since then, Peru's president, has always given the closing speech.

In October 1968, Juan Velasco Alvarado ousted President Fernando Belaúnde Terry in a military coup.  In 1971, the CADE's organizing committee proposed a National Development Plan; However, the Velasquista regime began to socialize the productive apparatus of Peru.

1970's 
At the 1972 conference, the chairman of the organizing committee of CADE, Walter Piazza Tangüis, gave a speech in which he defended private enterprise and market freedom. Moreover, he criticized the interventionist role of the State. President Juan Velasco Alvarado, also at the table of honor, responded to Piazza saying that it was a mistake to focus on social problems from his point of view as an entrepreneur. Velasco then gave the closing speech of the conference and was applauded by businessmen close to the regime.

For 1979's CADE, the organizers invited the presidential candidates in the 1980 Peruvian general election to discuss their plans and proposals before the business community. The conference was titled Peru: problems and solutions and was attended by presidential candidates Armando Villanueva, Luis Bedoya Reyes and Fernando Belaúnde Terry. Since then, it is a tradition that each year prior to the electoral cycle candidates attend and speak at CADE.

1980's 
In July 1987, President Alan García announced the nationalization of banking. The organizing committee did not invite García to the conference. They decided to hold in the city of Iquitos. President García did not return to the CADE until 2003 as leader of the opposition to the government of Alejandro Toledo.

In the 1989 conference, novelist and then candidate Mario Vargas Llosa delivered a speech , announcing reforms to address of the economic crisis and hyper inflation.

1990's 
In December 1991, the meeting was held in Arequipa and President Alberto Fujimori gave the closing speech, in which he criticized the salary of the senators and deputies, months before making his self-coup.Fujimori also raised the possibility of a national referendum to know if the people would agree or not to renew by thirds or by halves or that there is no re-election in Parliament. Two days later, the motion of censure against the minister Enrique Rossl Link was approved in the Chamber of Deputies, for which the minister had to resign.

In the 1993 conference, the president of the National Confederation of Private Business Institutions (CONFIEP), Jorge Picasso, proposed for the first time the presidential re-election of Fujimori.

International speakers 
The conference has had international guests such as presidents Ricardo Lagos, Carlos Salinas de Gortari, Álvaro Uribe, Sebastián Piñera; economist Michael Fairbanks, writers and scholars as Thomas Friedman, Francis Fukuyama and Paul Kennedy; high-level authorities as Juan Luis Londoño, Cecilia María Vélez, Sebastián Edwards Figueroa; and businesspeople as Bernardo Hernández González, among others.

Conferences

References 

Conferences
Business organisations based in Peru
Politics of Peru
Public–private partnership